Daouda Konaté (born 14 December 1991) is an Ivorian professional footballer who currently plays for French club FC Fleury 91 as a defender.

Career statistics

References
 
 Daouda Konaté at foot-national.com
 
 

1991 births
Living people
People from Abidjan
Ivorian footballers
Association football defenders
UJA Maccabi Paris Métropole players
Paris FC players
USL Dunkerque players
Tours FC players
Pau FC players
Ligue 2 players
Championnat National players
FC Fleury 91 players